Cotentin is a ROPAX ferry owned and operated by Brittany Ferries between Poole and Cherbourg from January until March 2021 and then Portsmouth and Le Havre from March 2021 until June 2021. She previously operated for Brittany Ferries between 2007 and 2013 between Poole–Cherbourg before being chartered to Stena Line as Stena Baltica serving the route between Gdynia and Karlskrona. The vessel was constructed by Aker Finnyards in Finland and delivered to Brittany Ferries on 9 November 2007. Cotentin sails under the French flag and is registered in Morlaix. The ship's gross tonnage is 22,308.

Description
Cotentin is powered by two MaK diesel engines creating a combined .

The ferry has capacity for 213 passengers and is equipped with 216 cabins and has 10 decks. Cotentin has the ability to carry 120 freight vehicles and has 2,188 lane meters of vehicle storage area.

Construction and service

Brittany Ferries service
The vessel was ordered on 2 August 2005 for construction by Aker Finnyards in Finland for Brittany Ferries. The vessel was named after the Cotentin Peninsula of France of which Cherbourg is the largest town. Sea trials commenced on 26 September 2007, after which she returned to the shipyard for completion. She was delivered to Brittany Ferries on 9 November 2007 and undertook berthing trials in Portsmouth and Poole on 14 November 2007 prior to sailing to her homeport of Cherbourg arriving the next day. The ship was christened and her first commercial sailing was the 23:45 Cherbourg–Poole service on 26 November 2007. Cotentin replaced  on weekday Poole–Cherbourg sailings.

Poole–Cherbourg
Poole–Santander Weekend service

An October 2006 article in International Freighting Weekly included comments from a Brittany Ferries executive which suggested that the ship would be placed on the Poole–Cherbourg route and that the timetable currently operated by  would be amended to give more "social" departure times, specifically changing the 02:00 summer time departure from Cherbourg.

Up to mid-July 2007 the Brittany Ferries Freight timetable showed a two-ship service on Poole–Cherbourg after the delivery of Cotentin, and no Portsmouth–Cherbourg sailings, indicating the company's intention to place the ship on the Poole–Cherbourg route alongside . Newspaper articles covering the launch of the vessel stated that the vessel would primarily be used on the Poole route.  Despite the initial announcement that the ship would run to Santander at the weekend a decision had not been made at the time as to whether this will be the ships Spanish destination due to port fees. Other ports that were in the running to receive Cotentin were Bilbao and Gijon.

On 21 July 2007 it was announced by Brittany Ferries that Cotentin would operate from Poole, a partially amended timetable for the Poole–Cherbourg route had been posted prior to the announcement though Cotentin sailings were absent until the delivery date was confirmed. The amendments allowed for Cotentins Poole–Santander weekend sailings.

The 2008 timetable revealed on 12 September 2007 showed Cotentin entering service in mid-November 2007 on the Poole–Cherbourg route with services to Santander commencing shortly after. Initially the 2008 timetable showed that after Christmas Cotentin would move to the Caen route to provide refit cover for  before returning to Poole. However, shortly after its release the timetable was edited and Cotentin remained on the Cherbourg and Santander routes throughout January. From mid-May 2008 Cotentin commenced the new summer timetable with sailings on the Cherbourg route carried out in 3 hours 45 minutes as opposed to the previous 4 hours 30 mins on Coutances. The crossing time was extended after a short time operating the new timetable as a fuel saving measure.

Stena Line
In 2013 Cotentin was chartered to Stena Line for their service between Karlskrona, Sweden and Gdynia, Poland.  She was renamed Stena Baltica and transferred from French to British flag with London as port of registry.

Return to Brittany Ferries

Amid rumours that the vessel would return to Brittany Ferries after the charter to Stena Line expired at the end of October 2020, the vessel emerged from dry dock in Gdansk in Brittany Ferries' new livery. The ship later departed for Le Havre, where the vessel had its original name of Cotentin restored, and was reflagged back to Cherbourg, France. 

Cotentin was confirmed to re-enter service from January 2021, between Poole and Cherbourg, providing extra capacity as part of the company's Brexit capacity agreement with the UK Government. The latter would be returned to Stena RoRo, having itself been replaced at Poole by fleetmate Barfleur. However, after delays in bringing Barfleur back into service, Cotentin will not leave the Cherbourg–Poole route.

On 13 November 2021 Rosslare EuroPort reported the vessel had entered service on the Rosslare to Le Havre route.

In December 2022, Brittany Ferries announced that from March 1st 2023, Cotentin will start taking passengers onboard, excluding foot passengers and cyclists, to finally allow passengers to use the Portsmouth to Le Havre route, which has been closed to passengers since 2020. Cotentin will also take passengers on the Rosslare to Le Havre route, which was previously freight only.

Notes

References

Ferries of the United Kingdom
Ferries of France
2007 ships
Baltica